Komlavi Loglo (born 30 December 1984) is a professional Togolese tennis player.  He was born in Badou, Togo.

Career
Loglo has spent his career on the Futures circuit, although he has played a handful of Challenger tournaments.  He is the top-ranked Togolese player.

On March 31, 2008, Komlavi was awarded a Tri-Partite Invitation to compete at the 2008 Summer Olympics singles event in Beijing.   He was the first tennis player from Togo to represent his country at the Olympics.  He lost in the first round to South African Kevin Anderson in straight sets.

Equipment 
Loglo plays with a Babolat Pure Drive Plus racquet, strung with Babolat Pro Hurricane Tour 17 String. He is sponsored by TTK - Tennis Teknology for clothes and Babolat for racquets and shoes.

Singles titles

References

External links
 
 

1984 births
Living people
Olympic tennis players of Togo
People from Plateaux Region, Togo
Tennis players from Barcelona
Tennis players at the 2008 Summer Olympics
Togolese expatriates in Spain
Togolese male tennis players
21st-century Togolese people